Henry Solomons (7 November 1902 – 7 November 1965) was a British businessman, trade unionist and Labour Party politician who briefly enjoyed a Parliamentary career.

Early career
Solomons was born in London and educated at London County Council schools, and went into sales as a profession. He joined the trade union Union of Shop, Distributive and Allied Workers and the Labour Party in 1932, and two years later was elected to Stepney Borough Council.

On the outbreak of the Second World War Solomons enlisted in the Army and resigned from the Council. He served in the middle east. At the end of the war, he returned to his old job. He became Organising Secretary for the Union of Liberal and Progressive Synagogues in 1946, a job which lasted eight years.

During his time in the Army Solomons took part in the Cairo Forces Parliament.

Political advancement
Solomons' political career advanced in the early 1950s. He served on the Executive of the London Labour Party from 1952 to 1960. From 1953 Solomons served on Hammersmith Borough Council. He became a full-time officer of USDAW in 1954. He was also a Governor of Westminster Hospital.

Parliament
At the 1964 general election Solomons was elected as Labour Member of Parliament for Kingston upon Hull North, gaining the seat from the Conservatives. However, his health was not good, and was not helped by the stresses of a close Parliament. He collapsed after an all-night sitting in June 1965. He was required to remain in Parliament so that he could be 'nodded through' in Divisions.

Solomons died on his 63rd birthday in Westminster hospital, leaving Labour with 313 seats in Commons, a majority of only one vote over its opposition (the Conservative Party had 303 and the Liberals 9). His death precipitated a byelection in a very marginal constituency; Labour's successful defence of the seat led Harold Wilson to call the 1966 general election.

References

M. Stenton and S. Lees, "Who's Who of British MPs" Vol. IV (Harvester Press, 1981)
Obituary, The Times, 8 November 1965.

External links 
 

1902 births
1965 deaths
English Jews
Jewish British politicians
Liberal Judaism (United Kingdom)
Members of Hammersmith Metropolitan Borough Council
Labour Party (UK) MPs for English constituencies
UK MPs 1964–1966